Shahnaz Pahlavi (born 27 October 1940) is the first child of the Shah of Iran, Mohammad Reza Pahlavi, and his first wife, Princess Fawzia of Egypt.

Early life and education
Shahnaz Pahlavi was born in Tehran on 27 October 1940. She is the only child of Mohammad Reza Pahlavi and his first wife Princess Fawzia. Shahnaz is the half-sister of Crown Prince Reza Pahlavi, Princess Farahnaz Pahlavi, Prince Ali Reza Pahlavi II and Princess Leila Pahlavi – the four children of the Shah by his third wife, Farah Pahlavi. Her maternal grandparents were King Fuad I and Queen Nazli of Egypt; and her paternal grandparents were Reza Shah and Queen Tadj ol-Molouk of Iran. She is also the niece of King Farouk I of Egypt and thus a cousin of the last Egyptian king, Fuad II.

Shahnaz Pahlavi was educated in a Belgian boarding school, the Lycée Léonie de Waha, in Liège and then in Switzerland.

Personal life
Her father had plans for Shahnaz's marriage with King Faisal of Iraq which was not materialized due to her unwillingness. Her first marriage, at age sixteen, was to Ardeshir Zahedi on 11 October 1957, at Golestan Palace in Tehran. He was one-time Iranian foreign minister and twice Iranian ambassador to the United States (1957–64 and 1972–79). Zahedi and she first met in Germany in 1955. The couple have one daughter, Princess (styled "Vala Gohari") Mahnaz Zahedi (born 2 December 1958). They divorced in 1964.

Shahnaz later married Khosrow Jahanbani in February 1971 at the Iranian Embassy, Paris. Their marriage lasted until Jahanbani's death in April 2014. They have one son, Keykhosrow (born 20 November 1971), and one daughter, Fawzia (born 1973).

During her father's reign, Shahnaz had investments in agricultural enterprises and assembly plants of Honda bicycles and motorcycles.

Later years
Since the Iranian Revolution Shahnaz Pahlavi has lived in Switzerland. She has Swiss citizenship. In December 2013 Shahnaz Pahlavi was granted Egyptian citizenship by the Egyptian government.

Honours
 Pahlavi Iran: Grand Cross of the Order of Aryamehr 
 Pahlavi Iran: Grand Cross of the Order of the Pleiades, 1st class
 Pahlavi Iran: 25th Anniversary medal
 Pahlavi Iran: 2,500 year celebration of the Persian Empire

Ancestry

Gallery

References

External links

20th-century Iranian women
21st-century Iranian women
1940 births
Daughters of kings
Exiles of the Iranian Revolution in Switzerland
Iranian emigrants to Switzerland
Iranian people of Albanian descent
Iranian people of Circassian descent
Iranian people of Egyptian descent
Iranian people of French descent
Iranian people of Turkish descent
Living people
Mohammad Reza Pahlavi
Mazandarani people
Pahlavi princesses
People from Tehran